Drackenstein is a municipality in the district of Göppingen in Baden-Württemberg in southern Germany.

Geography

Geographical location

Drackenstein is located on the slope between the Gosbach valley and the plateau of the Swabian Jura, about 25 km away from the district town Göppingen. On the plateau of the Swabian Jura, (karst mountains), in earlier times water was a precious commodity. Therefore, there was in Unterdrackenstein a Hydraulic ram, that pumped water to Oberdrackenstein. By connecting to the Lake Constance water supply in the 20th century these problems belong to the past.
At the opposite Drackensteiner Hang the Bundesautobahn 8 runs towards Stuttgart. There was the dragon hole, a cavity, which was filled in during the construction of the motorway. It is believed that the name of the community goes back to a legend of the dragon hole.

Neighboring communities
The municipality borders on Bad Ditzenbach, in the southeast on Merklingen,  in the southwest on Hohenstadt and in the west on the town Wiesensteig and the municipality Mühlhausen im Täle. Merklingen belongs to Alb-Donau-district, all others to Göppingen district.

Municipality arrangement
The municipality includes the village Oberdrackenstein, the hamlet Unterdrackenstein and the homestead Kölleshof.

History
Drackenstein was first documented in a chronicle of the Zwiefalten Abbey  from the year 1137.
See also: Castle Drackenstein

Population Development
The inhabitants of the community development 1837-2010.
Date	Population
1837	257
1907	252
May 17, 1939	305
September 13, 1950	417
May 27, 1970	310
December 31, 1983	346
December 31, 2000	432
December 31, 2005	431
December 31, 2010	437

References

Göppingen (district)